Legislative Assembly elections were held in Delhi on 8 February 2020 to elect 70 members of the Delhi Legislative Assembly. Voters turnout was recorded at 62.82%, a decline of 4.65% from the previous assembly election in Delhi but 2.2% more than the 2019 Indian general election in Delhi. The term of the assembly elected in 2015 expired on 22 February 2020. The Aam Aadmi Party, led by Arvind Kejriwal won 62 seats to claim an absolute majority in the elections.

Background 

The previous Assembly elections were held in February 2015. After the election, the Aam Aadmi Party formed the state government, with Arvind Kejriwal becoming Chief Minister.

Schedule 

The election schedule was  announced by the Election Commission of India on 6 January 2020 at 3:35 PM IST.

Parties and Alliances

Manifestos

Aam Aadmi Party 
The Aam Aadmi Party released a 10-point guarantee card on 19 January 2020, promising:
 24 hours of uninterrupted electricity through underground cables and free (up to 200 units) for every household.
 24 hours of uninterrupted water supply through pipes for every household and continuation of the ongoing scheme of up to 20,000 litres of free water.
 World class education facilities.
 Affordable, accessible, and advanced health facilities through Mohalla clinics and modern hospitals. 
 Efficient public transportation system with more than 500  km of metro lines and 11,000 buses. Free bus travel for women and students. 
 Reduction of pollution to one-third of the current levels, planting of 2 crore trees, and cleaning and rejuvenating of Yamuna. 
 Making Delhi debris and garbage-free. 
 Appointment of Mohalla marshals in addition to CCTV cameras, bus marshals, and street lights. 
 Roads, clean water, sewage system Mohalla clinics for unauthorized colonies
 Government builds housing for slum dwellers.

AAP released its elaborate manifesto with 28 key points on 4 February 2020. It promised:

 Enactment of the Delhi Janlokpal Bill currently pending with the central government for the last four years.
 Delhi Swaraj Bill for the formation of 2972 Mohalla sabhas for devolution of power with adequate funding. 
 Door Step Delivery of Ration
 Teerth Yatra (pilgrimage) for 10 lakh senior citizens
 Desh Bhakti Curriculum
 Spoken English, soft skills improvement, and personality development training for youth
 World's Largest Metro Network by extending Delhi metro network to 500  km and connecting new areas.
 Yamuna Riverside development by improving the banks and promoting it as a tourist destination.
 World Class Roads with improved beautiful and safe design.
 Appointments of New Safai Karmacharis 
 Compensation of Rs 1 Crore to the family of the deceased if the Safai Karmachari died while working.
 Free and fair business environment without official raids.
 Taking legal and administrative steps for protection from sealing of shops and industries
 Infrastructure development and up-gradation of markets and industrial area
 Rationalisation of property rates with actual market price
 Amnesty scheme to pardon pending cases on the old VAT regime.
 Allow markets to remain open 24x7 to allow Delhi to become a clock-active city, boosting economy and tourism.
 Enhance women's participation in the economy providing jobs to housewives. 
 Ensuring full ownership rights for the residents of the resettlement colonies
 Regularisation and Registry of unauthorized colonies
 Simplify criteria for getting the OBC certificate
 Due recognition for Bhojpuri by working with the central government in getting it included in the eighth schedule of the constitution
 Justice for victims of 1984 Anti-Sikh riots by ensuring that the findings of the SIT are acted upon.
 Regularisation of contract employees
 Pro-farmer land reforms by reducing the restrictions on the rights to use the land by farmers.
 Legal protections for street vendors by issuing a certificate of vending and reducing harassment of vendors by the police and municipality.
 Full statehood for Delhi to improve law and order and administrative efficiency.

Bharatiya Janata Party 

The Bharatiya Janata Party released its manifesto on 31 January 2020 where it promised to provide

 A corruption free government
 Creation of a development board for the newly authorized colonies
 Clean water in taps and zero dependence on water tankers for water supply by 2024
 Tackle air and water pollution
 Implementation of schemes of the Central government such as Ayushman Bharat Yojana, Pradhan Mantri Awas Yojana, Kisan Samman Yojna
 10 lakh jobs to the unemployed in next 5 years
 Promote the usage of electric vehicles (EVs) to reduce pollution
 Wheat flour (Atta) at ₹ 2/kg to poor families from the Public distribution system.
 351 Delhi roads that come under mixed land use will be notified and developed
 Highway project that enables traveling from Delhi to Mumbai in 12 hours
 crediting  to the bank account of farmers every year.
 Opening 10 new colleges and 200 new schools
 Removal of garbage heaps from Delhi
 Start an annual "Yamuna Mahotsav" for the celebration of the river

Indian National Congress 

The Indian National Congress released its manifesto on 2 February 2020. with 9 key points:

 Strong Lokpal
 Bhagidari
 Yuva Swabhiman Yojna – Unemployment Allowances
 Yaari Startup Incubation Funds
 Homi Bhabha Research Fund
 25% of budget spent on fighting pollution and improving transport
 Environment Ambassadors
 Jal Sanrakshan Board
 Rice Stubble to Energy Funds
 Bringing non-polluting industries back to Delhi

Surveys and Polls

Opinion Polls

Exit Polls 
The exit polls were announced by agencies after the poll ends on 8 February 2020. The exit polls were conducted on all 70 seats of Delhi Legislative Assembly and data was collected up to 4:00 PM. The voting ended at 6:00 PM officially.

Results

Results by Party

Results by districts

Results by constituency

Aftermath
Third Kejriwal ministry of the Delhi government was formed on 16 February 2020, led by Kejriwal as Delhi's chief minister for a  third time at Ramlila Maidan.

See also 

 2020 elections in India
 2019 Indian general election in Delhi
 2017 Municipal Corporation of Delhi election

External links

References 

State Assembly elections in Delhi
2020 State Assembly elections in India
2020s in Delhi